The Pandemonium Tour  was a worldwide concert tour by British pop duo Pet Shop Boys in support of their tenth studio album Yes. The tour visited Europe, Asia and the Americas.

Set list
 "Heart" (Stuart Price Mix) – contains elements of "More Than a Dream" (Magical Dub)
 "Did You See Me Coming?"
 "Pandemonium"/"Can You Forgive Her?"
 "Love Comes Quickly" (June–July 2009 shows only)
 "Love etc."
 "Building a Wall"/"Integral"
 "Go West"
 "Two Divided by Zero"
 "Why Don't We Live Together?"
 "New York City Boy" (Added August 2009)
 "Always on My Mind"
 "Closer to Heaven"/"Left to My Own Devices"
 "Do I Have To?"
 "King's Cross"
 "The Way It Used to Be"
 "Jealousy"
 "Suburbia"
 "What Have I Done to Deserve This?" (Added November 2009)
 "All Over the World"
 "Se a vida é (That's the Way Life Is)"
 "Viva la Vida"/"Domino Dancing"
 "It's a Sin"

Encore
 "Being Boring"
 "Together" (8 December 2010 only)
 "My Girl" (17–21 December 2009 only)
 "West End Girls"
 "Glad All Over" (Blackpool Show, 13 July 2010)

Encore
 "It Doesn't Often Snow at Christmas" (December 2009 shows only)

Tour dates

Cancelled dates
 24 November – Odessa, Ukraine
 25 November – Kiev, Ukraine
 22 October – Caracas, Venezuela

Cast and crew 

 Neil Tennant
 Chris Lowe

Dancers/Backing Vocalists
 Sophie Duniam
 Polly Duniam
 Charlotte Walcott
 Sean Williams

Programmer
 Pete Gleadall

External links
 Pet Shop Boys –  official website.
 Songs That the Pet Shop Boys Have Performed Live - Commentary by Wayne Studer, Ph.D.  Interpretations and analyses of every song written or performed by Pet Shop Boys

2009 concert tours
2010 concert tours
Pet Shop Boys concert tours